Megalobulimus fragilior is a species of air-breathing land snail, a terrestrial gastropod mollusk in the family Strophocheilidae. This species is endemic to Brazil.

References

Megalobulimus
Endemic fauna of Brazil
Taxa named by Hermann von Ihering 
Taxonomy articles created by Polbot
Taxobox binomials not recognized by IUCN
Gastropods described in 1901